Nihada Sewaneli (Silent Shadows) is a 2021 Sri Lankan Sinhalese language horror film directed by Sunil Premarathna and produced by Janaka Ranchagoda for Sineka Films. It stars Pubudu Chathuranga and Roshan Ranawana in lead roles along with Kumara Thirimadura, Tharuka Wanniarachchi and Mashi Siriwardane made supportive roles. The premiere of the film was held on 11 November 2021 under the patronage of Minister Rear Admiral Sarath Weerasekera at the Savoy Primory Cinema in Wellawatte. It has the implication that "even your children can be cursed if you destroy the environment."

Plot

Cast
 Pubudu Chathuranga
 Roshan Ranawana
 Kumara Thirimadura
 Harith Wasala
 Sarath Chandrasiri
 Ajith Weerasinghe
 Kumara Wadurassa
 Meena Kumari
 Tharuka Wanniarachchi
 Mashi Siriwardane
 Dhananji Tharuka
 Sandun Bandara
 Yohani Hansika

References

External links
 
 Kandak Sema on YouTube

Sinhala-language films
Sri Lankan drama films